Søren Kjeldsen (born 17 May 1975) is a Danish golfer who plays on the European Tour.

Professional career
Kjeldsen turned professional in 1995. Kjeldsen's success on the second tier Challenge Tour in 1997, which included his first victory as a professional in the Volvo Finnish Open, earned him membership for the main European Tour for 1998. He won his first European Tour title at the 2003 Diageo Championship at Gleneagles.

His second European Tour win came at the 2008 Volvo Masters at Valderrama Golf Club in Andalucia, Spain, where he won by 2 strokes over Martin Kaymer and Anthony Wall. He ended the year 10th on the Order of Merit, which to date is still his best year-end ranking.

Kjeldsen won his third European Tour event and second consecutive event on Spanish soil with a three stroke victory over David Drysdale at the 2009 Open de Andalucia in Marbella, Andalusia, Spain. Also in 2009, he finished third at the BMW PGA Championship, fourth at the Scottish Open, sixth at the PGA Championship and seventh at the WGC-CA Championship.

He finished second at the 2010 Andalucía Masters and the 2011 Volvo China Open. In 2012 he finished second at the Open de España and fifth at the Scottish Open.

In May 2015, Kjeldsen ended a six-year drought and won his fourth European Tour title at the Dubai Duty Free Irish Open. On a very windy final day, Kjeldsen held a two stroke lead but shot a 76 five over par round to fall into a three-man playoff with Eddie Pepperell and Bernd Wiesberger. On the first extra hole, Kjeldsen found the par five 18th green in two and after Pepperell and Wiesberger could not get up and down for their birdies, he two putted from 30 feet for the victory. Kjeldsen maintained his 100% record of winning when holding the 54 hole lead, which now stands at 4-for-4. The next week he finished second at the Nordea Masters. Later he finished second at the Made in Denmark and British Masters tournaments.

Kjeldsen represented Denmark in the Eisenhower Trophy in 1994 and at the World Cup in 1998, 1999, 2003, 2004, 2009, and 2016, winning the 2016 event alongside Thorbjørn Olesen.

He has featured in the top 50 of the Official World Golf Ranking.

For 2017, Kjeldsen accepted PGA Tour membership.

Professional wins (6)

European Tour wins (4)

European Tour playoff record (1–1)

Challenge Tour wins (1)

Other wins (1)

Results in major championships

CUT = missed the half-way cut
"T" indicates a tie for a place

Summary

Most consecutive cuts made – 5 (2009 Open – 2010 Open)
Longest streak of top-10s – 1 (three times)

Results in The Players Championship

CUT = missed the halfway cut
"T" indicates a tie for a place

Results in World Golf Championships
Results not in chronological order prior to 2015.

QF, R16, R32, R64 = Round in which player lost in match play
"T" = tied
Note that the HSBC Champions did not become a WGC event until 2009.

Team appearances
Amateur
European Boys' Team Championship (representing Denmark): 1991
Jacques Léglise Trophy (representing the Continent of Europe): 1993
European Amateur Team Championship (representing Denmark): 1993
European Youths' Team Championship (representing Denmark): 1994
Eisenhower Trophy (representing Denmark): 1994

Professional
World Cup (representing Denmark): 1998, 1999, 2003, 2004, 2009, 2016 (winners), 2018
Seve Trophy (representing Continental Europe): 2009
EurAsia Cup (representing Europe): 2016 (winners)

References

External links

Danish male golfers
European Tour golfers
PGA Tour golfers
Olympic golfers of Denmark
Golfers at the 2016 Summer Olympics
Sportspeople from Aalborg
People from Ascot, Berkshire
1975 births
Living people